Skills in Pills is the debut studio album by the European supergroup Lindemann, featuring Rammstein frontman Till Lindemann and Peter Tägtgren, founder of Hypocrisy and Pain. It was released on 23 June 2015 through Warner Central Europe. It was preceded by the lead single "Praise Abort", released on 28 May 2015, with "Fish On" receiving a single release later on 9 October. The album reached number one in Finland and Germany, also peaking within the top 10 in Austria, Croatia, Czechia, Denmark, Hungary, Norway, and Switzerland.  This is the only Lindemann album so far to have been sung completely in English, as Till reverted to his usual native German Language on the second album F&M.

Composition 
When commenting on the way the album was prepared, Tägtgren said:

He defined it as a "party album [...] I see it as a 2015 Billy Idol kinda thing, except the lyrics are more ironic and funny. It's good music to pre-party to before you go out to the bar". Unlike in Rammstein, Lindemann sings all the songs in English instead of his native German. About this, Tägtgren said:

Lindemann himself said: "It's very different and very difficult too. I had to kinda crawl into it and Peter encouraged me to do it. To be honest, I wasn't sure about it. My self-confidence was really low, but it became better and better. I researched a lot with the lyrics and even my experience in writing e-mails in English was like zero, so I had to learn a lot and work with dictionaries and shit like that".

Tägtgren defined the lyrics as "spooky" and said: "Read between the lines and find the irony. Don't think it's all so serious. For us, it's not to provoke. Yes, we want to shock people but, like I said, it's a party album". Lindemann also commented on this matter: "We didn't want to be really nasty or provocative or insulting. [This is] the first time English speakers can understand the lyrics, which is usually impossible in Rammstein. It's very sexual, but that's what I've done in Rammstein for twenty years, it's just that nobody's understood it!"

"Ladyboy" was the first song written by the duo. "Golden Shower" and "Skills in Pills" are songs based on Lindemann's personal experiences. Referring to the latter, he commented: "I grew up in the eastern part of Germany and we had booze of course, but sometimes we had these 'pills parties', where we put shit together. We collected stuff, because it was hard to get medication, and then we had like medication orgies which was really strange".

"Praise Abort" was composed around something Lindemann sang to his smartphone and sent to Tägtgren. The song received a promotional video, released on 28 May, which Tägtgren defined as "grotesque" and "very sick".

"Cowboy" was a critic of American masculinity, showing the cowboys as the ones that would come over and beat up the Indians, contradicting Hollywood's propaganda.

Release 

On 22 and 23 April, respectively, the band revealed the track listing and the cover for the album at their Facebook page. On 2 May, the band released audio snippets of the title track. On 11 June, snippets for the remaining songs were released.

The album was released on 22 June 2015 via Warner Central Europe.

In October 2015, the band streamed a B-side of their second single "Fish On", titled "G-Spot Michael".

Packaging 
The album is available in several different editions, including a standard edition, digital, special, super deluxe, and vinyl. The latter three include a bonus track, while the super deluxe edition also comes with an 80-page hardcover book and different cover art.

Track listing

Personnel 
Writing, performance and production credits are adapted from the album liner notes.

Lindemann
 Till Lindemann – vocals
 Peter Tägtgren – all instruments, orchestra arrangement

Additional musicians
 Clemens Wijers (Carach Angren) – orchestra treatment; vocals on "That's My Heart"
 Jonas Kjellgren – Banjo on "Cowboy"
 Pärlby Choir – children's choir

Production
 Peter Tägtgren – production, engineering; mixing (only "Fish On", "Golden Shower", "That's My Heart")
 Jonas Kjellgren – recording (drums only)
 Stefan Glaumann – mixing (except "Fish On", "Golden Shower", "That's My Heart")
 Svante Forsbäck – mastering
 Jacob Hellner – post-production
 Tom van Heesch – post-production editing

Artwork and design
 Rocket & Wink – artwork
  – photography

Studios
 Abyss Studio, Pärlby – recording, mixing
 Studio Drispeth Nr. 1 – pre-production (vocals only)
 Hometown Studios, Stockholm – mixing
 Chartmakers Audio Mastering, Helsinki – mastering
 Big Island Sound, Stockholm – post-production

Charts

Weekly charts

Year-end charts

Certifications

References

External links 
 

2015 debut albums
Lindemann (band) albums
Albums produced by Peter Tägtgren
Shock rock albums
Warner Music Group albums